G. Kuchelar was an Indian politician of the Dravida Munnetra Kazhagam (DMK) who served as mayor of Madras from 1961 to 1963. He belonged to the Dalit community.

References 

 

Mayors of Chennai
Place of death missing
Place of birth missing
Year of birth missing
Year of death missing